The following tables compare general and technical information for a number of statistical analysis packages.

General information

Operating system support

ANOVA
Support for various ANOVA methods

Regression
Support for various regression methods.

Time series analysis
Support for various time series analysis methods.

Charts and diagrams
Support for various statistical charts and diagrams.

Other abilities

See also
 Comparison of computer algebra systems
 Comparison of deep learning software
 Comparison of numerical-analysis software
 Comparison of survey software
 Comparison of Gaussian process software
 List of scientific journals in statistics
 List of statistical packages

Footnotes

References

Further reading
 
 
 
 
 

Statistical packages
 
Statistics-related lists
Mathematical and quantitative methods (economics)